Furcula furcula, the sallow kitten, is a moth from the family Notodontidae. It was first described by the Swedish entomologist Carl Alexander Clerck in 1759 from a specimen found in Sweden.

Distribution
The moth can be found in Europe (including the Mediterranean region), Anatolia and through Asia to China. It is also found in North America.

Description

The sallow kitten is grey/white and has a wingspan of 27 to 35 mm. The first part of the wing has a large grey middle band. It differs from the poplar kitten (Furcula bifida) in its generally smaller size, but more especially in the shape of the black line forming the outer margin of the central band; this is always more or less angled or dentate towards the front margin of the wings, whereas, in the poplar kitten, this portion of the line forms a clean curve. The flight period ranges from April to the end of August. Depending on location the moth has one or two generations per year and is attracted to light.

 Ova
The dark purple, hemispericle eggs are laid in batches of two or three on the upper surface of leaves in May or June and again in August. They hatch after nine days.

 Larva
The caterpillar can grow up to 35 mm and is bright green with a purple brown marking on the saddle and can be found from May through to September. The main host plants are willow (Salix species) and occasionally aspen (Populus tremula) and other poplar (Populus species). Larvae can be found on small isolated moorland bushes.

 Pupa
Before pupation the larva hollows out a recess. The pupa is dark purple-brown and pupation takes place in a tough cocoon constructed from a mixture of chewed wood-pulp and silk.

References

Further reading
 South R. (1907) The Moths of the British Isles,  (First Series), Frederick Warne & Co. Ltd.,  London & NY: 359 pp. online

External links

 Sallow kitten on UK Moths
 Fauna Europaea
 Moths and Butterflies of Europe and North Africa
 www.schmetterling-raupe.de
 Lepiforum.de Taxonomy and Photos

Notodontidae
Moths described in 1759
Moths of Asia
Moths of Europe
Moths of Japan
Moths of North America
Taxa named by Carl Alexander Clerck